La Bajada is a small neighborhood in West Dallas, Texas, United States. Its boundaries are Canada Drive to the north and east, Sylvan Avenue on the west, and Singleton Boulevard to the south.

Demographics
For statistical purposes, the neighborhood is identified as Block Group 1 of Census tract 101.02 by the United States Census Bureau.

As of the census of 2000, there were 1,133 people residing within the neighborhood. The racial makeup of the neighborhood was 45.7% White, 2.2% African American, 0.8% Native American, 47.5% from other races, and 3.8% from two or more races. Hispanic or Latino of any race were 93.5% of the population.

Education
Public education in La Bajada is provided by the Dallas Independent School District (DISD). Lorenzo DeZavala Elementary School serves students in grades pre-kindergarten through five. Sixth through eighth graders are zoned to Thomas A. Edison Middle Learning Center, which feeds into L.G. Pinkston High School .

References

External links
West Dallas Chamber of Commerce – Official site.